Brig. Gen. Nyo Twan Awng (also spelled Nyo Tun Aung, born Zaw Mro Thet on 4 March 1981) is the deputy leader of the United League of Arakan and the Vice Commander-in-Chief of the Arakan Army.

Biography  
Nyo Twan Awng was born Zaw Myo Thet on 4 March 1981 in Kyaukpyu, Rakhine State, Myanmar. During his teenage years, he attended medical studies in Yangon. He received his doctorate from Dagon University. In 2009, the Arakan Army was founded and Nyo became one of its first members, attending the group's first training session. While working in Yangon as a surgeon, he had to avoid arrest by the Myanmar Police Force. He escaped to northern Myanmar and studied zoology as the Arakan Army's medical trainer.

He characterised his group's January 4 independence day attack on four police stations as a defensive action in response to a build-up of Tatmadaw forces in northern Rakhine State. He also pointed to the Tatmadaw's announcement on December 21, 2018, that it was suspending operations in five regional commands in northern Myanmar until April 30 as further evidence of an imminent campaign. However, the Tatmadaw extended to two and half months until the Ta'ang National Liberation Army (TNLA) and other Northern Alliance groups launched coordinated attacked on the Defence Services Technological Academy in Pyin Oo Lwin on August 15, which promoted the Tatmadaw retaliate.

In June 2018, Nyo attended the second Panglong Conference in Naypyidaw, meeting with government officials to discuss the peace process for the decade-long conflict in the country.

Awards and honors  
 Medal of Honor (AA)
 Medal of Freedom and National Human Settlement
 University of Dagon Medical Award (1999)

References

External links 
 

Burmese people of Rakhine descent
Living people
Place of birth missing (living people)
1981 births